Status quo ante synagogue may refer to:
 Status Quo Ante Synagogue (Trnava), Slovakia
 Status Quo Ante Synagogue (Târgu Mureș), Romania
 Rumbach Street Synagogue, Budapest, Hungary

See also 
 Status quo ante (disambiguation)
 Schism in Hungarian Jewry